Capitano Ernesto Cabruna (1889–1960) was a professional soldier who became a World War I flying ace credited with eight aerial victories. He served in Italy's military police, beginning in 1907. After service in Libya and Rhodes, he received a Bronze Medal for Military Valor a year after Italy's involvement in World War I began. He turned to aviation, became a pilot, and as such earned his first Silver Medal for Military Valor at the end of 1917.

In 1918, Cabruna twice singlehandedly attacked swarms of enemy aircraft, winning victories both times. He was also raised into the officers' ranks. On 26 September 1918, he broke his clavicle. Two days later, he forced his way back to flying to participate in the Battle of Vittorio Veneto. He claimed his final two aerial victories on 25 October. The day before the Austro-Hungarian surrender, 2 November 1918, Cabruna strafed two of their airplanes parked on their own airfield. He then won a Gold award of the Medal for Military Valor.

Cabruna remained in military service postwar, serving as Aide de Camp to the Aviation Chief of Staff. He became an intimate of proto-fascist poet Gabrielle D'Annunzio. He left the military on 2 June 1932, having served his nation a quarter of a century. When he died on 9 January 1960, he was interred on D'Annunzio's estate. His Spad VII fighter plane is enshrined in the Italian Air Force Museum.

Early life and service
Ernesto Cabruna was born on 2 June 1889 in Tortona, the Kingdom of Italy. His family were merchants. Young Cabruna attended technical school until, on 18 October 1907, he joined the Carabinieri Reali, Italy's version of military police. The following year, he performed commendably during the 1908 Messina earthquake. On 30 September 1911, he was promoted to Vice Brigadiere. From April 1912 to May 1913, he was posted to Tripolitania, Libya. He later took part in the occupation of Rhodes.

World War I
On 31 January 1915, Cabruna was promoted to Brigadier. In October 1915, he was posted to the 10th Company of the Turin and Allievi (Cadets) Legion. On 15 May 1916, while stationed near Asiago, he rescued victims of an Austro-Hungarian bombing raid while under fire. His valor was rewarded with a Bronze Medal for Military Valor. In July 1916, Cabruna reported to Torino for pilot's training. He was granted two licenses for the Maurice Farman 14, awarded on 6 October and 16 November 1916. He was posted to 29a Squadriglia on 28 December 1916. He would fly reconnaissance missions while so assigned.

Ernesto Cabruna flew his first combat sortie on 2 January 1917. On 31 May 1917, he was promoted to Maresciallo. After completing training on Nieuport fighters, he was assigned to a fighter squadron, 84a Squadriglia. On 21 September 1917, he was transferred to another fighter squadron, 80a Squadriglia. He scored his first aerial victory on 26 October, and another on 5 December. By the end of 1917, Cabruna merited a Silver award of the Medal for Military Valor.

On 26 January 1918, he was transferred to another fighter squadron, 77a Squadriglia. Their squadron symbol was a red heart on a while circle; aft of this, Cabruna appended the coat of arms of his native city of Tortona.

He would score a victory for his new squadron on 12 March 1918. On 29 March 1918, he broke away from a unit patrol and singlehanded attacked 11 enemy aircraft. Cabruna fired several bursts of machine gun fire into a red fighter, which exited in an abrupt dive. This daring feat was featured on the cover of a leading Italian magazine, Domenica del Corriere; the illustration was by Achille Beltrame.  Although existing Austro-Hungarian aviation loss files fail to support it, Cabruna was credited with the victory.

On 4 April 1918, he was commissioned into the officers' ranks in a battlefield promotion. On 15 June 1918, the swarm of enemy planes numbered 30, but Cabruna again plunged into solo combat and downed his fifth victim to become an ace.

Cabruna shot down two more enemies in June, before hitting a dry spell. On 26 September 1918, he crashed an Ansaldo A.1 Balilla in a landing accident, breaking his collarbone. The new fighter had broken an oil line; spurting oil blinded Cabruna, and he was fortunate to survive the crashlanding.

He was sidelined two days, then returned to flight duty for Italy's final offensive, the Battle of Vittorio Veneto. He claimed to have shot down two enemy aircraft on 25 October for his final aerial victories. On 2 November 1918, he strafed two enemy airplanes on the airfield at Aiello and destroyed them. The next day, the Austro-Hungarians surrendered. Cabruna would be awarded the Gold Medal for Military Valor for these latter day exploits.

Post World War I
The Bongiovanni commission report of 1 February 1919 confirmed eight of the nine victories that had been symbolized on Cabruna's Spad VII. He was credited with victories over seven enemy airplanes and an observation balloon. In April 1919, he was promoted to Sottotenente. He was also posted to 39a Squadriglia, where he became a familiar of Gabrielle D'Annunzio. Cabruna joined in D'Annunzio's short-lived revolt against the Italian government. When this ended, the ace was unemployed and penniless.

Cabruna re-entered service. In December 1923, he transferred from the Carabineri to the Regia Aeronautica. He returned briefly to Libya. In 1925, he was promoted to Capitano. He was assigned as Aide de Camp for the Aviation Chief of Staff. However, his career apparently floundered, and he was discharged on 2 June 1932 for ill health.

He became disgruntled with fascism after his departure from the military. During World War II, British military intelligence listed him as a member of the "Free Italy" organization, with the cover name of "X-19".

After World War II, Ernesto Cabruna chose life as a near-hermit. He died on 9 January 1960.

Death and legacy
Ernesto Cabruna died in Rapallo on 9 January 1960. He is buried on the premises of D'Annunzio's Vittoriale mansion. Cabruna's original Spad VII fighter is now displayed in the Italian Air Force Museum.

Endnotes

References
 Franks, Norman; Guest, Russell; Alegi, Gregory.  Above the War Fronts: The British Two-seater Bomber Pilot and Observer Aces, the British Two-seater Fighter Observer Aces, and the Belgian, Italian, Austro-Hungarian and Russian Fighter Aces, 1914–1918: Volume 4 of Fighting Airmen of WWI Series: Volume 4 of Air Aces of WWI. Grub Street, 1997. , .
 Guttman, Jon. SPAD VII Aces of World War 1. Osprey Publishing, 2001. , 9781841762227.
 Varriale, Paolo. Italian Aces of World War 1. Osprey Pub Co, 2009. .

Italian aviators
Italian World War I flying aces
Italian military personnel of World War I
Italian Air Force personnel
Recipients of the Gold Medal of Military Valor
Recipients of the Silver Medal of Military Valor
Recipients of the Bronze Medal of Military Valor
1889 births
1960 deaths